John Ketton (died 1316) was a medieval Bishop of Ely.

Ketton was elected to Ely on 2 March 1310 and consecrated on 6 September 1310. He died on 14 May 1316.

Citations

References
 

Bishops of Ely
13th-century births
1316 deaths

Year of birth unknown